Rusty Mae Moore (October 25, 1941 – February 23, 2022) was an American transgender rights activist and educator. She ran a de facto homeless shelter for transgender people in the 1990s and 2000s, known as the Transy House. One such resident included Sylvia Rivera, one of the most prominent voices in trans and queer activism, who lived at Transy House until her death in 2002.

Biography 
Moore was born on October 25, 1941, in Sewickley, Pennsylvania, near Pittsburgh. She grew up in nearby Aliquippa. In 1963, she married Nancy Voigt and 1970 they had a daughter, Jonica Melanie Moore, in São Paulo, Brazil. The couple later divorced. In 1978, Moore married Sara Lee Zug; that same year they had a daughter, Amanda Lee Zug Moore, and in 1983 a son, Colin McGeorge Zug-Moore. Moore and Zug separated then divorced in the early 1990s; she subsequently came out as transgender to her family. Moore then entered into a relationship with Chelsea Goodwin, and they married in 2018.

Moore died as a result of cardiovascular complications on February 23, 2022, in Pine Hill, New York.

References

1942 births
2022 deaths
American activists
American educators
Transgender rights activists